Lionel Morgan is the name of:

Lionel Morgan (footballer) (born 1983), English football midfielder
Lionel Morgan (rugby league) (born 1938), Australian rugby league footballer